Bob Weston (born 1965) is an American musician, producer, recording engineer, and record mastering engineer. Critic Jason Ankeny declares that "Weston's name and fingerprints are all over the American underground rock of the post-punk era, producing and engineering dates for a seemingly endless number of bands." As a performer, Weston is best known as the bass guitarist in the groups Volcano Suns and Shellac.

Biography
Weston was born and raised in Waltham, Massachusetts. During the summers of 1985 and 1987, he marched as a bugler with the renowned Garfield Cadets Drum and Bugle Corps from Garfield, New Jersey. The corps won the Drum Corps International World Championships in both those years. Weston still plays trumpet, as on the albums The Sea and the Bells by Rachel's (1996) and Things We Lost in the Fire by Low (2001).

In 1988, he earned a B.S. in Electrical Engineering from the University of Lowell in Lowell, MA. While working at the University's campus radio station, WJUL, he began mixing live performances of Boston-area bands such as Pixies and the Blake Babies.

In 1987 Weston joined The Volcano Suns, playing bass guitar. The group was led by Peter Prescott, (previously the drummer for Mission of Burma, who had broken up in 1983).

Weston joined Steve Albini and Todd Trainer in Shellac in 1991. Under Albini, Weston honed his studio production skills and has gone on to record and mix material for bands including Sebadoh, June of 44, Polvo, The Coctails, Archers of Loaf, Chavez, Rachel's, Ken Vandermark, 33.3 and Rodan. Weston was also Albini's Assistant Engineer on Nirvana's In Utero album. According to a 2006 interview, being a musician has helped shape Weston's work recording, mixing and mastering: "It’s obvious to me that the best recording engineers have played in bands. You understand the dynamic better and can almost become an unofficial band member during the session. And it’s pretty easy to tell on what sort of session your musical opinion is wanted or not." However, Weston's recording and mixing work is not limited to music: he occasionally freelances for National Public Radio, often working on comedy quiz show Wait, Wait, Don't Tell Me, which is headquartered in Chicago.

In 2002, Weston joined the reunited Mission of Burma, taking the place of Martin Swope as tape manipulator and live engineer for the band. He appears on and recorded the albums ONoffON, The Obliterati, The Sound The Speed The Light, and Unsound.

In early 2007, Weston opened Chicago Mastering Service with Jason Ward on Chicago's west side.

Equipment
 A detailed gear diagram of Bob Weston's Shellac bass rig is well-documented.

References

External links
 Interview with EQ Magazine featuring Weston and Mission of Burma

Living people
American audio engineers
American rock bass guitarists
American male bass guitarists
People from Waltham, Massachusetts
Guitarists from Massachusetts
Mission of Burma members
University of Massachusetts Lowell alumni
Mastering engineers
1965 births
Guitarists from Chicago
American male guitarists
Shellac (band) members
20th-century American guitarists
American post-punk musicians
American punk rock bass guitarists
American punk rock singers
American male singer-songwriters
Singer-songwriters from Illinois
Singer-songwriters from Massachusetts